Matthew Logan Vasquez is best known as the lead singer/songwriter/guitarist of indie rock group Delta Spirit. He is also a member of indie supergroup Middle Brother. He has released three solo albums: Solicitor Returns (2016), Does What He Wants (2017), and Light'n Up (2019). His current project is Billboard-described indie supergroup Glorietta. Matt currently lives in Wimberley, Texas when not on tour.

References

Year of birth missing (living people)
Living people
American indie rock musicians
American musicians of Mexican descent
American emigrants to Norway
Middle Brother (band) members